Olga Zhitova (born 25 July 1983) is a retired Russian volleyball player. She was a member of the Russian team that won the gold medal at the 2006 FIVB Women's World Championship.

References
 FIVB Profile

1983 births
Living people
Russian women's volleyball players
Place of birth missing (living people)
Sportspeople from Irkutsk
20th-century Russian women
21st-century Russian women